Peroxide was a punk zine published and edited during the late 1970s by Andrew Thomas, Quentin Cook (a.k.a. Norman Cook) and Ian McKay). Inspired by punk zines such as Chainsaw, Peroxide lasted only two issues, with McKay being ousted by Cook after the first issue. Importantly however, the publication is noteworthy as it served to provide Cook with his first significant point of connection with the professional music business (his contact with Adam Ant being a notable example), and for both McKay and Thomas, their first experiences of publishing. Whilst Cook remained in the music business, McKay became a writer on the visual arts and culture, while Thomas moved into the business sector; he is currently the publisher of Communicate magazine and owner of Cravenhill Publishing.

Copies of Peroxide have latterly proved highly collectable owing largely to the connection with Norman Cook.

References

Music magazines published in the United Kingdom
Defunct magazines published in the United Kingdom
Magazines with year of establishment missing
Magazines with year of disestablishment missing
Punk zines